The Yerevan trolleybus system forms part of the public transport network in Yerevan, the capital city of Armenia.  Since the closure of the Gyumri trolleybus system in 2005, it has been Armenia’s only trolleybus system.

History

Opened on 16 August 1949, the system was once much more extensive than it is today.

At its greatest extent, the system had 20 lines, operated by a total of 300 trolleybuses, the vast majority of which were either Czech made Škoda 9Tr or 14Tr units, or Soviet made ZiU-682 models.

In recent years, the system has shrunk, and most of the Soviet era trolleybuses have been replaced by newer vehicles.

Lines 
As of 2011, the system was made up of the following lines: 1, 2, 9, 10 and 15.

Fleet 
The Yerevan trolleybus fleet still has a significant number of Škoda 14Tr units in service.  The Škoda 9Trs and ZiU-682s have all been withdrawn.

The latest trolleybuses in the fleet are mostly Russian made LiAZ-5280 vehicles, and second hand Berliet ER100 trolleybuses originally used on the Lyon trolleybus system.

15 new Yutong trolleybuses will join the system in 2023.

Accident
On 16 September 1976, a trolleybus operating alongside Yerevan Lake went out of control and fell from the dam wall into the lake.  The sound of this accident was heard by Shavarsh Karapetyan, a multi-champion finswimmer, who was training with his brother Kamo, also a finswimmer, by running alongside the lake.

The trolleybus lay at the bottom of the reservoir some 25 meters (80 ft) off the shore at a depth of 10 meters (33 ft). Karapetyan swam to it and, under conditions of almost zero visibility due to the silt rising from the bottom, broke the back window with his legs. The trolleybus was crowded, it carried 92 passengers and Karapetyan knew he had little time, spending some 30 to 35 seconds for each person he saved.
 
Karapetyan managed to rescue 20 people, but this was the end of his sports career: the combined effect of cold water and the multiple wounds he received left him lying unconscious for 45 days, with subsequent sepsis (due to the presence of raw sewage in the lake water) and lung complications preventing him from continuing his sports career.

See also

List of trolleybus systems
Transport in Armenia
Trolleybuses in former Soviet Union countries
Trolleybus usage by country
Yerevan Metro

References

Books

External links

 
 
 The trolley-bus and Shavarsh Karapetyan

Transport in Yerevan
Yerevan
Yerevan
Transport disasters in 1976
Transport disasters in Armenia